Timothy David Gardam (born 14 January 1956), is a British journalist, media executive and educator. He was Director of Television at Channel 4 until 2003, after which he served as Principal of St Anne's College, Oxford until 2016. He now serves as Chief Executive of the Nuffield Foundation.

Early life
Gardam was born on 14 January 1956 to the novelist Jane Gardam. He studied at Rokeby Preparatory School, Westminster School and Gonville and Caius College, Cambridge, where he obtained a double first in English.

Career
He subsequently worked at the BBC (where he created Timewatch and edited Newsnight), and as director of programmes at Channel 4, commissioning the first series of Big Brother. He was then appointed by the Department of Culture, Media and Sport to lead a review of digital radio in Britain.

In January 2008, he began a three-year term on the board of Ofcom, the independent regulatory authority for the UK communications industries.  He was subsequently reappointed for a second three-year term.

In 2004, he was elected Principal of St Anne's College, Oxford, succeeding Ruth Deech. His achievements included the construction of a new library and the St Anne's Coffee Shop (STACS), and the strengthening of college finances, academic performance, and outreach efforts. In early 2016, Gardam announced that he would be stepping down as principal at the end of the academic year, in order to become chief executive of the Nuffield Foundation.

He was Chairman of the Consumers' Association Council from 2015 to 2019.

References 

Living people
Alumni of Gonville and Caius College, Cambridge
BBC people
Heads of colleges in the United Kingdom
British male journalists
Channel 4 people
Panorama (British TV programme)
People educated at Westminster School, London
Principals of St Anne's College, Oxford
English television editors
1956 births